Cesilie Carlton (born 27 March 1981) is an American high diver who won the first gold medal at the high diving competition at the 2013 World Aquatics Championships. She defeated her fellow countrywoman Ginger Huber and German Anna Bader to win the gold medal. In 2015, she won the silver medal.

References

1981 births
Living people
American female divers
Female high divers
World Aquatics Championships medalists in high diving
21st-century American women